El Hasafah is a village in Shibin El Qanater in the Qalyubia Governorate.

Population (2006) 
Its population was 5,206 at the 2006 Census.

Economy 
The economy of the city depends on agriculture, commerce and to a lesser extent on industry.

Populated places in Qalyubiyya Governorate
Qalyubiyya Governorate